The Man in Half Moon Street is a 1945 science fiction romantic melodrama dealing with a man who retains his youth and cannot die, living throughout the ages. The plot is similar to Oscar Wilde's Picture of Dorian Gray, except that there are more logical explanations for the eternal youth of the main character. The film is based on a 1939 West End play of the same title by Barré Lyndon, and stars Nils Asther and Helen Walker with direction by Ralph Murphy.

Plot
A scientist, Dr. Karell (Asther), has discovered a treatment that can indefinitely prolong his life, using glands stolen from human victims. Having kept his achievement secret for over a century of continuous youth, Karell now has to contend with the curiosity of his new girlfriend Eve (Walker), the increasing guilt of his colleague Dr. Van Bruecken (Schünzel), and a police investigation of his most recent murder. Above all, he needs a renewal of his treatment, or else the mortality he has been evading will catch him at last.

Cast
 Nils Asther as Dr. Julian Karell
 Helen Walker as Eve Brandon
 Reinhold Schünzel as Dr. Kurt van Bruecken
 Paul Cavanagh as Dr. Henry Latimer
 Edmund Breon as Sir Humphrey Brandon
 Morton Lowry as Alan Guthrie
 Matthew Boulton as Det. Insp. Ned Garth
 Brandon Hurst as Simpson-Butler

Home video
This film is now available on DVD from a number of vendors. The 1959 Hammer Films remake, The Man Who Could Cheat Death, is available on DVD from Legend Films.

External links
 

1945 films
1945 drama films
1940s science fiction films
American drama films
American fantasy films
Films directed by Ralph Murphy
Films scored by Miklós Rózsa
American films based on plays
American black-and-white films
Melodrama films
1940s English-language films
Films with screenplays by Garrett Fort
Films about immortality
1940s American films